Major General Halefom Ejigu Moges is an Ethiopian major general who was acting Head of Mission of the United Nations Interim Security Force for Abyei (UNISFA) from 2014-2015. His assignment ended with the appointment of Haile Tilahun Gebremariam as Head of Mission on 28 January 2015.

References

Ethiopian generals
Living people
United Nations military personnel
Ethiopian officials of the United Nations
Year of birth missing (living people)